Idrijska Bela (or Idrianer Bela) is a dispersed settlement in the Municipality of Idrija in the traditional Inner Carniola region of Slovenia. It lies in the hills southwest of the town of Idrija.

Name
The name of the settlement was changed from Bela to Idrijska Bela in 1952.

References

External links 
Idrijska Bela on Geopedia

Populated places in the Municipality of Idrija